Girty or Girtys may refer to:

People
 George Herbert Girty (1869–1939), American paleontologist
 Simon Girty (1741–1818), American colonial

Other
Girty Lue, a fictional class of battleship
Girty Run, a stream in West Virginia
Girtys Run, a tributary of the Allegheny River in Pennsylvania
Girty Island, an island of the Maumee River in Ohio
Girty, Pennsylvania, United States

See also